Baawri is a 1982 Bollywood film directed by A. C. Tirulokchandar, starring Jaya Prada, Yogeeta Bali and Shreeram Lagoo. The film was a remake of the director's own Tamil film Bhadrakali.

Cast
 Rakesh Roshan as Shyam Bhardwaj
 Jaya Prada as Gayatri
 Yogeeta Bali as Jwala
 Nirupa Roy as Laxmi
 Shreeram Lagoo as Rajaram Sharma
 Asrani as Pandit Bansilal Shastri
 Seema Deo as Mrs. Bhardwaj

Music
The music director for the film was Khayyam and the lyricist was Maya Govind.

References

External links

1982 films
1980s Hindi-language films
Films directed by A. C. Tirulokchandar
Films scored by Khayyam
Hindi remakes of Tamil films